Stéphane Rotenberg (born 21 September 1967) is a French journalist and television presenter.

Journalism career 
Before becoming a television presenter, Stéphane Rotenberg began working as a journalist in printing press. From 1991 to 1997, he  worked for specialized magazines such as Sport Auto and Auto Journal. He also signed some articles for general press like VSD, Vogue and Libération. From 1995 to 1997, he became a reporter and then associate editor of the program Turbo on channel M6.

In 1998, he became the editor of the programs on France 2. In 1999, he was associate at the direction of the programs and documentaries such as Comme au cinéma, Union libre (with Christine Bravo), C'est au programme and Tout le monde en parle.

Television career 
In 2000, the director of the programs and production of the channel AB Moteurs confides to Rotenberg to host the famous program of the channel dedicated to the automotive. The same year, Rotenberg joined M6 and hosts the program Normal / Paranormal. In 2001, he hosts on the channel Match TV the program Comme à la télé, a talk show in which he interviews television personalities.

In 2003, he hosts on M6 the program Bachelor, le gentleman célibataire (French version of The Bachelor). After the success of the first season, he then hosted the following seasons in 2004 in 2005. Still in 2003, he hosts Stars intimes on M6, in which he talks about the personal life of celebrities.

Since 2006, he has presented a number of programs on M6 such as Magiciens, leurs plus grands secrets, L'Inventeur de l'année and Pékin Express (French version of Peking Express), all broadcast in 2007. From January to April 2008, he presents the third season of Pékin Express. He then presents the fourth season from April to July 2009, the fifth season in April 2010, the sixth season in November 2010, and the seventh season in April 2011.

In January 2009, he presents Ice Road Truckers on channel W9. After the success of the first season, he then presents the second season. Still in 2009, he co-hosts with Alex Goude and Sandrine Corman the program Total Wipeout on M6. In February 2010, he presents with Sandrine Corman the first season of the French version of Top Chef. He then presents alone the second season in January 2011, the third season in January 2012, and finally the fourth season in February 2013.

In April 2012, Rotenberg hosts on M6 the eighth season of Pékin Express, le passager mystère. During the shooting, he was victim of an accident after losing control of his side-car after being violently hit by a car. He had minor injuries and had the chance to continue hosting the season with only a few aftermath. In April 2013, he hosts the ninth season of Pékin Express, le coffre maudit.

References

External links 

Profile of Stéphane Rotenberg on the official site of M6 

1967 births
French journalists
French television presenters
People from Pas-de-Calais
Living people
French male non-fiction writers